The Liga Nacional de Básquet Awards (English: National Basketball League Awards) are the yearly individual awards that are given by Argentina's top-tier level men's professional club basketball league, the Liga Nacional de Básquet (LNB), or "La Liga".

MVP

Player nationality by national team:

The Liga Nacional de Básquet (LNB) MVP is an annual award that is given to the Most Valuable Player of the regular season of the Argentine Basketball League. The award first began with the 1987 season.

Players with multiple MVP awards

Finals MVP

Player nationality by national team:

The Liga Nacional de Básquet (LNB) Finals MVP is an annual award that is given to the Most Valuable Player of the Argentine Basketball League's Playoff's Finals. The award first began with the 1985 season.

Players with multiple Finals MVP awards

Best Foreign Player

Player nationality by national team:

The Liga Nacional de Básquet (LNB) Best Foreign Player is an annual award that is given to the Argentine Basketball League's best player that was not born in Argentina. The award first began in the 1990–91 season.

Players with multiple Best Foreign Player awards

Most Improved Player

Player nationality by national team:

The Liga Nacional de Básquet (LNB) Most Improved Player (MIP) is an annual award that is given to the Most Improved Player of the regular season of the Argentine Basketball League. The award first began with the 1995–96 season.

Revelation of the Year

Player nationality by national team:

The Liga Nacional de Básquet (LNB) Revelation of the Year (ROY) is an annual award that is given to the Rookie of the Year of the regular season of the Argentine Basketball League. The award first began with the 1989 season.

Sixth Man of the Year

Player nationality by national team:

The Liga Nacional de Básquet (LNB) Sixth Man of the Year is an annual award that is given to the best 6th man of the regular season of the Argentine Basketball League. The award first began with the 1990–91 season.

Players with multiple Best Sixth Man awards

Ideal Quintet

Player nationality by national team:

The Liga Nacional de Básquet (LNB) Ideal Quintet is the Argentine Basketball League's annual award for the five best players of each season. The Ideal Quintet consists of one player per position: point guard, shooting guard, small forward, power forward, and center. The award first began with the 2004–05 season.

Players with multiple Ideal Quintet selections

Coach of the Year

The Liga Nacional de Básquet (LNB) Coach of the Year (COY) is an annual award that is given to the best head coach of the regular season of the Argentine Basketball League. The award first began with the 1989 season.

Head coaches with multiple Coach of the Year awards

References

Bibliography
Liga Nacional de Básquetbol Guía Oficial 2015/2016, p. 184 (awards) and p. 211 (leaders).

External links
LNB Official website 
Pick and Roll (LNB news, info & statistics)  
Argentinian LNB league at Latinbasket.com

Awards
Argentina